The Suzuki Fronte is an automobile that was first introduced in March 1962 as a sedan version of the Suzulight Van. The nameplate remained in use for Suzuki's Kei car sedans as well as some commercial-use derivatives until it was replaced by the Alto name (originally only used for commercial vehicles) in September 1988. The word "fronte" alludes to the fact that the car is front-wheel-drive, although during the years when the Fronte was rear-engined, rear-wheel-drive, Suzuki stated that it referred to the car being at the front of the Kei class.

360cc Era

Suzulight Fronte

The Suzulight Van-based TLA Fronte was introduced in March 1962 as a passenger car version of the popular light van. The Suzulight Fronte was based on the earlier Suzulight SS series, itself a fairly straightforward copy of the even older Lloyd LP400, and as such had a transversely mounted two-cylinder, two-stroke engine driving the front wheels. Suspension was independent on all four wheels, with transverse double leafsprings on both axes. 2,565 were built in the first year. Of 360 cc (64.0 × 56.0 mm) this method allowed for a lower production cost and better cooling, allowing Suzuki to price the TLA below the more spartan TL Van. As with the light commercials on which it was based, the transmission was a three-speed manual with an unsynchronized first gear and a column-mounted shifter.

After only one year's production of the TLA, the new FEA engine appeared, featuring the SELMIX automatic lubrication system, improved fuel economy and eliminated the need for pre-mixed gasoline for the two-stroke engine. This was counteracted by the installation of a new, all-synchronized four-speed gearbox.

Two more Frontes came in fourth and eighth places. The winning driver was Osamu Mochizuki (望月 修) who crossed the finish line just ahead of teammate Haruhisa Fujita (藤田 晴久), both a full minute ahead of the third-placed Subaru 360. The fastest lap was also made by a Fronte, by eighth-place finisher Isamu Kawashima, who managed a lap speed of  around the  course.

In October 1965 the further improved CCI engine (Cylinder Crank Injection), which further cut down oil consumption and startup smoke. The FEA-II engine also gained an extra horsepower, for a total of 22. The FEA-II also received a new front-end treatment, aping its bigger brother the Fronte 800. Production was about 150 cars per month at this time, very low compared to the 2,000 or so Subaru 360 built monthly. In 1966 this became known as the "New FEA" after another slight facelift which included a new dashboard. By the end of its production run (1967), the Suzulight Fronte was beginning to look rather dated, especially at the rear end, and the chassis was positively archaic.

Fronte 360

The Suzuki Fronte 360 two-door sedan (chassis code LC10) was introduced in March 1967 to replace the earlier Suzulight Fronte. The "Y-16", as the project had been known, had a rear engine and ten inch wheels for maximum packaging. The car sprang from the 1961 "FC" project, also with a rear-engine but with rear-hinged doors, a reverse-angle rear window (à la the Ford Anglia) and an overall rakish profile. This earlier stillborn project, called the "Suzulight Sports 360", was a reaction to the success of the rear-engined Subaru 360 and had a unique 360 cc two-cylinder engine. Even earlier (1960), there was an open two-seater prototype called the FA, with the same engine and layout as used in the FC. Suzuki's new test track in Ryūyō was put to intense use for the development program, while tropical and cold weather testing was carried out in Thailand and on Hokkaido respectively. In the Japanese domestic market, the Fronte competed directly with the Mitsubishi Minica, Honda N360, Daihatsu Fellow, and the Subaru 360.

Its overall shape is of a roundish profile, soon nicknamed "Daruma" for a Japanese roly-poly doll - this is the smallest (and arguably the only Kei Jidosha) car to use the "coke bottle styling" which became popular in the United States for the 1965 model year. The transmission was a four-speed manual, originally with synchromesh on the top three gears only. In a break with Fronte's front-wheel drive traditions, the powertrain was placed transversely in the rear, as was becoming the norm for kei cars of the period. The LC10 Fronte was dubbed the "Queen of the keis" by Suzuki's marketing department - a claim which may have influenced Subaru to name their 360 replacement the "Rex".

The LC10 was introduced with great fanfare and a large marketing campaign, which included television commercials. First reaching dealerships on 27 May 1967, market response was immediate and strong. While the original target production was 3000 per month, this was soon nearly tripled. Monthly production remained above 8000 until the end of the LC10's life. A new, additional factory in Iwata was opened in August 1967 to add supplementary capacity. While in overall a fairly simple and light car, the triple carburettors were awkwardly located at the front of the engine, behind the rear seat. To adjust them, a mechanic would have to reach through a small egg-shaped opening from the rear seat. Another complaint touched on the car's near absence of luggage space. The rear lights and the front indicators used the same lenses, only of different colors. There was even a brochure made of a US-market Fronte 360, complete with miles-per-hour speedo and uncovered sealed-beam headlights, but most likely none were brought over. The Fronte soon received a very minor update reflecting stricter safety laws; as of October 1968 it sported a driver's side integrated headrest, seat belts up front, and turn signal flashers on all four corners.

The SS was the quickest kei-car yet, managing to break the twenty second barrier in reaching 400 metres from standing with 19.95 seconds. The car had different wheels and also featured a rev counter. It was introduced with an unusual marketing stunt: racing driver Stirling Moss and TT-winning motorcycle racer Mitsuo Itoh were engaged to drive two SS Frontes (one red, one pale yellow) on a high-speed demonstration journey along Italy's  Autostrada del Sole leading from Milan to Napoli. The original car currently resides in Suzuki's museum in Hamamatsu. In 1969 the "SS Standard" model also appeared, with the powerful engine but with a minimum of trim, specifically intended for competition purposes.

There was also an export version introduced in January 1969, the Suzuki Fronte 500 with the engine enlarged to 475 cc. This was only built in De Luxe trim. The 500 produces  at 6000 rpm, four more than does the original 360 export version. In May 1969 the Fronte received its first real facelift. The dashboard was modernized by two square gauges instead of a large oval one, the ignition key was moved from the dashboard to the steering column and the two-tone interior was changed to simply black. Externally, the decorative trim pieces in the front grille and on the air inlets at the rear were replaced by real grilles. First gear was also synchronized, unlike on earlier cars. In July 1969 the Fronte S appeared, which offered the SS equipment but with the more economical 25 PS engine. Another facelift took place in April 1970, when the grille became more ornate and the sporting version was rebaptized "SSS". Marketing materials referred to this version as the "New Fronte". The more powerful version was installed in the Hi-Super DX and S versions. Production ended in October 1970, in advance of the succeeding "Stingray" Fronte.

Fronte Van/Estate/Custom

January 1969 saw the arrival of the Suzuki Fronte Van three-door wagon (LS10) as a successor to the Suzulight FE-series Van which had been built alongside the LC10 for a couple of years. Design was square in style, radically different from the Fronte sedan. To begin with, the rear opening was a single unit, hinged at the top. The Van (and its subsequent siblings) has MacPherson struts in front and semi-elliptic leaf springs in rear. Unusually for Japanese cars, the spare wheel was mounted in the engine compartment - something more commonly seen in French cars - to help free up more space for luggage.

By July 1969 a three-door wagon version intended for private use arrived, the LS11 Suzuki Fronte Estate, to give passenger car buyers a model with more luggage room without the indignity of having to buy a commercial vehicle. The Estate had the same top-hinged rear opening, but featured a more comfortable, while still folding, rear seat. There was also a folding luggage shelf in the trunk. Sops to safety, already somewhat better than the regular Fronte because of the engine location and the driver's seat being located farther back, included an anti-glare dashboard and a round horn pad in the steering wheel.

In June 1970 the Estate model was succeeded by the Suzuki Fronte Custom. The Custom had the same wagon body style but lacked a top opening at the rear. While it received a new grille it came with a downwards opening trunk lid only, possibly to please the private customer who found the luggage room in the rear-engined Fronte too small by disguising the fact that a wagon (not popular in Japan in those days) was involved. Thus, the Fronte Custom became one of only two wagons ever without a bottom to top back opening, the other being the 1941-42 Chrysler Town and Country (The Austin A40 Farina had a similar layout but was marketed as a sedan in that form). A more luxurious and powerful (110 km/h) Hi-Custom version was added two months later, but the entire Custom range was deleted in 1971. Also in 1971 the Fronte Van received a minor facelift (called "Fresh New Fronte Van" in period marketing material), including a somewhat baroque new grille and a new, horizontally divided two-piece tailgate. The twin round taillights were also replaced by rectangular units. This version also featured Suzuki's new self-lubricating "CCIS" system (Cylinder Crank Injection and Selmix).

In March 1972 the Fronte Van received the two-cylinder, two-stroke water-cooled 28 hp L50 engine also used in the Suzuki Carry, becoming the LS20 in the process. A new grille gave away the changes underneath the skin, as did prominent "Water Cooled" badges on the rear. Aside from the engine, the most important change was that the rear lid was now once again a top-hinged single-piece unit. As before, Standard, DeLuxe, and Super DeLuxe versions were available. The Fronte Van was replaced in April 1973 by the strange-looking Fronte Hatch. Just under 28,000 of the LS20 Van were built in the thirteen months it was in production.

Sting Ray Fronte

In November 1970, the third generation Suzuki Fronte 71 (LC10 II) two-door sedan was introduced. Its aggressive design was commonly referred to as the "Sting Ray Look". The rear-engined chassis design and engine remained the same as its predecessor the LC10, although with a slightly longer  wheelbase. Other minor chassis differences were the addition of a front anti-roll bar and the change to a semi-trailing arm rear suspension layout. There were 31, 34 or 36 hp versions available, the lineup being topped by the S, SS, SSS and SSS-R (the letter "R" merely indicating the fitment of radial tires) versions. As of May 1971 a water-cooled version, the LC10W, became available in either GL-W (34 hp) or 37 hp GT-W/GTR-W ("R" again meaning radial tires) versions. The success of the water-cooled models led Suzuki to quickly introduce further versions, with the lesser GO-W and GS-W models (also with 34 hp) appearing two months later.

By November 1971, after a minor facelift including a new grille, the cars were called Suzuki Fronte 72. The sporty air-cooled engines were dropped as the more refined water-cooled units became more and more popular, except in the very lowest end of the market. In March 1972, water-cooled GD-W (deLuxe) and GU-W (standard) were added. In export markets, there was the Suzuki Fronte 500 with the 475 cc LC50 engine, also marketed as the Suzuki LC50 (29 PS, 115 km/h). In October 1972 the Fronte 72 was replaced by the "New Fronte" (with a new fascia and bonnet). By this time, only the Standard model ("U") retained the air-cooled engine, with an available automatic clutch. The top-of-the-line "GT-W Type II" came equipped with front disc brakes, as does its sister model the Fronte Coupé GXCF.

Fronte Coupé

In September 1971 the seminal, Giugiaro-designed Fronte Coupé arrived, the predecessor to the well known Cervo range. Giugiaro's original concept was a revised version of the one-box design he had already used for the "Rowan Elettrica" city car of 1967. Suzuki then modified the design considerably, changing the proportions and adding ornamentation. Based on the Stingray "LC10 II" model, the Fronte Coupé was only ever offered with the water-cooled rear-mounted LC10W engine. While initially only available as a two-seater, these were gradually replaced by four-seater versions. At first only two versions were available, the regular GE and the luxurious GX (or GER/GXR for models fitted with radial tires), both with a  version of the LC10W. Model changes:

 February 1972 – GXF, four-seater 2+2 added. "F" signifies four seats.
 March 1972 –  less equipped 2+2 GXPF added.
 June 1972 – Base  GAF version introduced (¥399,000). The GAF has painted bumpers and no spotlights in front, as well as chromed hubcaps rather than the sportier wheels of the better equipped models. Inside the center console was deleted, as were several gauges, and a more pedestrian two-spoke steering wheel replaced the original sportier looking three-spoked unit. Top of the line GXCF also appears, equipped with front disc brakes, and a radial tire equipped GER.
 October 1972 – Two-seater versions discontinued.
 May 1974 – Only a  engine now available, due to new emissions rules. Only GXF and GXCF versions remain.
 June 1976 – Discontinued. In October 1977 the Cervo replacement arrived.

The Fronte Coupé was simply referred to as the Suzuki LC10W in export markets, where it received a  356 cc engine. The Fronte Coupé was resurrected in a revised and larger form as the Suzuki Cervo in October 1977, after Kei car regulations were changed in January 1976.

Fronte LC20

In July 1973 the New Fronte became the old Fronte as it was replaced by the new LC20. Its very rounded "Oval Shell" design was a radical departure from its predecessor, very much in the style of the 1970 Datsun Cherry E10. The underpinnings remained largely the same, however, retaining the water-cooled engines and suspension from the LC10 with a 20 mm longer wheelbase (2030 mm). Overall dimensions, dictated by the kei-car regulations, remained 2995×1295 mm. The air-cooled engines were discontinued, but the engine code remained LC10W - with the "W" denoting water-cooling. The radiator is mounted up front. The bumpers were very small, no more than trim pieces. A strange and sour-looking front gave way to an ovoid rear end, culminating in an engine cover perforated by at least 50 vent openings. On the rear fenders two louvered vents allow air to the engine compartment; the right-hand one also opens to allow access to the fuel filler. Finally, a frameless opening rear glass provides a measure of hatchback practicality.

A big first for Suzuki was the availability of a four-door version, lagging behind competing offerings from Daihatsu, Subaru, and Honda. Between the two engines, two bodystyles and several different equipment levels, a confusingly large lineup was on offer: two-door GU, GD, GH, GC, GT, GT type II, and four-door FU, FD, FH, FC, FT. In July 1974 the 37 hp GT engine was downgraded to 35 PS, while the 34 PS version was replaced by a 32 PS unit. The lowest powered 32 and 34 PS models had single Solex carburetors rather than the triple units used on more powerful models. Later on, the range was rationalized and the models renamed Standard, Deluxe, and Custom.

The LC20 was taken out of production at the end of May 1976, although the doors and basic layout would continue in use for the succeeding SS10 (Fronte 7-S) series. The LC20 also entered both in CBU and CKD in indonesia, at first it entered as CBU units in 1974 under PT. Indonesia motor Company and then in 1976 the production of CKD units began with Suzuki's local partner PT Indomobil Group. It, along with the ST10 Carry, was the first four-wheeled Suzuki built there. It was only built there for about a year, soon being replaced by the new SS10.

Fronte Hatch

In April 1973 the LS30 "Fronte Hatch" replaced the LS20 Suzuki Fronte Van. It used the 28 hp two-cylinder two-cycle water-cooled 359 cc L50 engine also seen in the Carry and Jimny and was of a front-engine, rear-wheel drive layout. The Hatch was available in four equipment levels, ranging from the very basic "E" which lacked even a heater, via "B" and "D" to the range topping "T" version. Being more comfortable than the LS20 Van it replaced, the Hatch had headrests in both front seats and got the same dashboard as the "Sting Ray" Fronte (albeit only with two gauges).

As for the earlier LS20 Fronte Van, the Hatch's spare tire was mounted in the engine compartment to allow for more cargo space in the rear. While marketed as the "LS30", the Hatch's chassis code remained LS20 as for its predecessor. To set it apart, chassis numbers skipped ahead to LS20-200001.

By December 1974 the car lost the "Fronte" badging, but retained the Fronte name in marketing material. Also in 1974 (May), the emissions became cleaner to match the 50年 (1975) emissions rules, but power was down to 26 PS. The basic "E" version was dropped. The first cosmetic change the 360 series Hatch underwent was a modification of the trunklid to accept the larger license plates (330 × 165 mm) legislated for January 1, 1975. In export markets, the vehicle was also available with rear side window panels. For the 1976 model year another horsepower was lost, as emissions rules were gradually tightened, and the Hatch received a new grille, the taillights were held in place by two rather than three screws, and the C-pillar logo was altered. A more luxurious "Custom" model was also brought out for 1976. Production ended in May 1976.

Reflecting new Kei car rules, in July 1976 the length of the Hatch was extended to 3190 mm (wheelbase to 2100 mm), all ahead of the firewall. The new front and new large bumpers made what was an already odd-looking car even stranger. Now the Suzuki Fronte Hatch 55 (or 550), it received the three-cylinder 539 cc LJ50 engine, which was a de-smogged L50 engine with an extra cylinder tacked on: it was also known as the T5A/T5B in other applications. The new model code was SH10. The inside remained nearly unchanged and the only differences at the rear was a new, larger bumper, and the change to a single strut for the rear gate for increased access. Power remained 25 PS as for late model 360 Hatches, but torque was up considerably. The lineup was again restricted to B, D, and T models, with the T receiving chromed rather than painted bumpers.

For 1979 the models were renamed Standard, Deluxe, and Super Deluxe. The Hatch was succeeded in May 1979 by the SS30 Alto.

Fronte 550

Fronte 7-S

Government plans had been made to gradually increase the Kei car engine size limit to 550 cc, to make room for cleaner four-stroke engines and to reverse the slowing Kei car sales curve. Many manufacturers responded with interim, 500 cc models in 1976, Suzuki among them. In June 1976 the Fronte 7-S was presented, model code SS10. As per the new regulations, it was  wider than the LC20 series and had a larger engine of 443 cc. The more squared-off front end also allowed for a larger front luggage area.

The T4A engine was still a three-cylinder two-stroke (simply a bored out version of the LC10), as Suzuki considered themselves experts at this configuration. The new Suzuki TC ("Two Catalyst") emissions system meant that it provisionally met the new 1975 (50年) emissions standards thanks to a two-way catalyst and a secondary air supply device. The layout remained RR, with a four-speed manual transmission. "7-S" was meant to stand for Space, Safety, Sense, Save money, Silent, Stamina, and Suzuki TC, not necessarily always in the same order. In January 1977, the Fronte received some light alterations including new seats, a rectangular Suzuki badge in the front grille, taillights of a new construction, and a slightly remodelled engine lid with a somewhat wider recess for the license plate. This model is sometimes referred to as the SS10-2, to tell it apart from the pre-facelift model.

Suzuki's inability to fully meet the 1978 emissions regulations with the two-stroke engine compelled them to write a contract with Toyota to purchase engines from their subsidiary Daihatsu, Suzuki's main competitor. Beginning in May 1977 Daihatsu's catalysed  four-stroke AB10 engine was installed in the SS11, selling in parallel with the two-stroke at a slightly higher (by ¥18,000) price. Four-strokes had a "4" logo in the grille. These were very weak sellers, offering much less torque and drivability than their two-cycle brethren. Torque was 3.9 kgm at 3500 rpm, versus 4.6 kgm in the smaller two-stroke engine. At about the same time, in an attempt at meeting the tighter 1978 (53年) emissions standards with a two-stroke, the new SS12 Fronte 7-S was presented. It had a now even cleaner T4A engine called the TC53. "TC53" stood for Twin Catalyst, year 53 of the Showa era (1978 in the common era). A mere 6,421 SS12s were built, compared to 66,540 SS10 Frontes.

The interim SS12 was replaced by the "full scale" 550 cc SS20 version presented on 27 October 1977, with a slight facelift consisting of a new grille, redesigned cladding around the C-pillars, and a new dashboard. The SS20 is equipped with the T5A engine (first seen in the Jimny), with 539 cc it offered  at 5000 rpm and 5.3 kgm at 3000 rpm, which helped bring top speed up from 105 to 110 km/h (65 to 68 mph). To use up leftover four-stroke engines, the SS11 received the same facelift, becoming the SS11-2. The SS11-2 was fairly short-lived, though, as the new T5A engine met the emissions regulations on its own and Suzuki was now able to terminate their contract with Toyota. The torque gap between the four- and the two-stroke models was widened further: while the SS11 could climb a slope of 0.34 tanα (18.8˚) the SS20 could manage 0.52 tanα (27.5˚). The production run of the SS20 was not very long either, coming to an end after just over a year and a half.

The Fronte 7-S was never a big seller, as it was an old design and two-stroke engines were beginning to lose favor with Japanese car buyers. The SS10 and SS20 Frontes were both clearly based on the old LC20, making do with a widened LC20 chassis and using its doors and many interior parts. For the SS20 Suzuki resorted to increasingly awkward efforts to hide the LC20's curvy design with square blocks of plastic, without much success. Production ended in April 1979, as Suzuki was getting ready to introduce their new generation of front-wheel drive kei cars. In the few export markets where it was available, the Fronte 7‑S was simply sold as the "Suzuki SS10" and "SS20", foregoing the Fronte name. It was also built with left-hand-drive. The SS10 received an engine less burdened by emissions equipment than the Japanese market model, producing  at 4500 rpm. It was available as the two-door FC (Custom) and the four-door GL (Deluxe).

SS30/SS40

In May 1979 the Fronte 7-S was replaced by the new SS30/SS40 Fronte. The Fronte Hatch 55 was also discontinued, from now on the commercial versions all used the Alto name. Alto also came to be the name used in export markets. SS30S was the two-stroke engined version of the Fronte (539 cc, three cylinders,  T5B) while the SS40S received a newly developed, 543 cc four-stroke three-cylinder engine, the F5A. This developed  and proved very popular, soon displacing the two-stroke entirely. The T5B would no longer be available in the Fronte after May 1981. The Alto light commercials received the SS30V/SS40V designation, and considerably lower gearing since it was mainly intended for short distance inner-city use.

The new Fronte was a big step away from the SS20, making the switch from a rear-engined, rear-wheel drive configuration to a more up-to-date transversely mounted engine in front, driving the front wheels. Wheelbase was increased from 2030 to 2150 mm and the new car was much more spacious. The four-door Fronte had an opening rear glass window, whereas the two-door Alto got a proper rear hatch. In some export markets the car was just known as the Suzuki SS40. In Europe, the Fronte (usually labelled Alto) was also sold with a 796 cc four-stroke three (SS80) from July 1981 and was 100 mm longer, thanks to bigger bumpers. These cars also received larger 12-inch wheels. Four-doors received the SS80F chassis code, while three-door passenger versions were called SS80G. Other markets, such as Chile, received the SS80 with "Fronte 800" badging, echoing the 1960s car with the same name.

In October 1982 the Fronte/Alto received a minor facelift, and now featured square headlamps. In May 1983, the Fronte's engine was mildly updated, while on the outside there was a new grille and door mirrors rather than fender-mounted ones. The valve timing was adjusted and transistor ignition was introduced, the compression ratio nudged up to 9.7:1 (from 9.5), and the EGR and catalytic converter were improved. A new top version, the FS-QG was also introduced. It offered digital instrumentation. The Alto generally outsold the Fronte at a rate of about five to two, although the Fronte remained the best selling kei passenger car into 1984.

From 1984 until replaced in 1986, the four-door SS80 Fronte was built in India by Maruti as the "800".

Cooper Motor Corporation (CMC) of Nairobi, Kenya, also assembled the four-door SS80 in the eighties.

Pricelist

FX 800
In Pakistan the four-door version was available with the F8B engine (800 cc, 40 hp), and was sold as the Suzuki FX 800. The FX was sold from 1983 to 1988 when it was replaced by the SB-308 body style (also known as the CB72, which ended production in early 2020), called the Suzuki Mehran. The FX features prominently as the car driven by the protagonist in Mohsin Hamid's debut work Moth Smoke.

CB71

In September 1984 the new Fronte CB71 was introduced. Now only with the F5A four-stroke engine, it retained the suspension of the SS40 model (leaf sprung, beam axle). The most expensive model, the FG, received front disc brakes (the lesser versions making do with drums all around) and a 5-speed manual transmission or 2-speed automatic. As before, the Fronte received higher gearing than the Alto, reflecting its intended usage.

In July 1986 the CB71 became the CB72 after a rather thorough facelift. The headlights were new, of the wraparound sort and the interior was changed with a new dashboard, but the main changes were under the skin: the old rear suspension was replaced with Suzuki's patented ITL suspension (Isolated Trailing Link). This three-link rigid setup considerably improved the ride. The engine had two horsepower more in the Alto; this is due to less stringent emissions standards for commercial vehicles. In August 1987 a three-speed automatic transmission became available, and lastly there was also a part-time four-wheel drive version of the five-door CB72 Fronte (the CD72S, from January 1988). By September, the CB/CD72 was replaced. The 1988 Suzuki Cervo used the chassis, front clip and door panels from the CB/CD72 Fronte.

A slightly longer and wider version (bigger bumpered), equipped with the same 796 cc engine as the SS80, producing  was the export model. In Europe it was sold as the Alto, in other countries as the SB308 or with the Fronte nameplate. The facelifted Fronte has also been produced (or still is being built) under license by many other manufacturers:

 Chang'an SC 7080
 Jiangbei Alto JJ 7080
 Jiangnan JNJ 7080 Alto
 Maruti 800 (aka Suzuki Maruti)
 Suzuki Mehran
 Xian Alto QCJ 7080

CN11S

In September 1988, the new CN11S Fronte debuted. A sleeker looking body, with rear side windows that wrapped around the edge of the roof, also helped sales. Apart from the very cheapest variants, the Fronte got front disc brakes and 12 inch radial tyres. The Fronte also received the 547 cc 12-valve SOHC F5B engine from the Suzuki Cervo, developing  at a lively 7500 rpm. There was no three-door version this time, but a 4WD variant (CP11) was available.

And then, only six months later, Suzuki's longest running nameplate was laid to rest. When Japanese tax laws for vehicles in the kei class were changed in April 1989, kei commercial vehicles were no longer quite as favored as before. But, since the Alto had long had a much larger market share than the Fronte, it was decided to drop the Fronte name and focus marketing efforts on the Alto, which now became available as a five-door and three-door sedan as well as a three-door van. With the 796 cc engine, the CN11S Fronte was built in China as the Anchi 6330. The CN11 was never exported to Europe, as they received the Cervo Mode (labelled as an Alto) instead. However, South Korea's Daewoo built the car under license as the Tico, and this model saw a great deal of sales particularly in Eastern Europe.

References

 Auto Katalog 1978. Vereinigte Motor-Verlage GmbH & Co KG: Stuttgart, 1977
 
 
 Tutte le Auto del Mondo TAM 77/78. Quattroruote/Editoriale Domus: Milano, 1977.

Fronte
Front-wheel-drive vehicles
Rear-engined vehicles
Kei cars
Sedans
Cars introduced in 1967

1970s cars
1980s cars